María Cecilia Ubilla Pérez (born 1956) is a Chilean politician who is member of the Chilean Constitutional Convention.

References

External links
 Profile at Chile Constituyente

Living people
1956 births
21st-century Chilean politicians
Pontifical Catholic University of Chile alumni
Members of the Chilean Constitutional Convention
People from Santiago
21st-century Chilean women politicians